Alucita sycophanta is a moth of the family Alucitidae. It is found in Sri Lanka.

References

Moths described in 1906
Alucitidae
Moths of Sri Lanka
Taxa named by Edward Meyrick